The Deba River is a river in the Basque Country, Spain. It rises in Arlaban, into Araba province lands, and flows into the Atlantic Ocean, in the Bay of Biscay, in Deba Gipuzkoa province.

Rivers of the Basque Country (autonomous community)
Gipuzkoa
Rivers of Spain